Magnus Rognan Midtbø (born 18 September 1988) is a Norwegian rock climber and YouTube video blogger. He was born in Bergen, Norway. He retired from competitive climbing in 2017.

Career

Climbing
Midtbø started climbing in 2000 at 11 years of age after his mother enrolled him in a class. After just one year of climbing, he won the Norwegian Youth Championship, and a year later, in 2002, he on-sight climbed his first  lead route Øgletryne at the Sageveggen rock wall, near Bergen.

In 2005, he won the World Youth Championships in Beijing, China.

After graduating from high school in 2007, Midtbø moved to Innsbruck, Austria. At the time, Innsbruck attracted many of the world's top climbers, including David Lama, Jakob Schubert, and Anna Stöhr, who trained together for competitions. In an interview, Midtbø described Lama as the most talented person he had ever climbed with as well as a personal inspiration during their tenure in Austria.

In August 2010, he made his most challenging ascent to date, when he completed the route Ali Hulk sit start extension in Rodellar, Spain. The route is composed of a boulder (climbed without rope) and a sport climbing segment. The first ascent was made by Daniel Andrada in 2007. The grade was initially considered to be  but has been since downgraded to 9a+/b. In an interview with UK Climbing, Midtbø stated that there were many challenges to this route, such as resting in the initial boulder section to work out the rest of the route and mustering sufficient core strength to overcome the overhang.

In May 2013, Midtbø returned to Rodellar to on-sight Cosi fan tutte, graded . , only four other people had on-sighted routes graded 8c+ or higher: Patxi Usobiaga, Adam Ondra, Ramon Julian Puigblanque, and Alex Megos.

Midtbø retired from competitive climbing in May 2017. In the 95th vlog of Midtbø's YouTube channel, he described his decision to retire: "I still get motivated just by climbing. I think some people need a specific goal, but I’ve never felt like I needed one. It sounds really cheesy, I know. I just love climbing. I love being in the nature. I love the feeling of feeling free, but it is like that you know. I don’t know. I like the lifestyle, I like traveling, I like trying hard, and most of all, I like the feeling of feeling really fit, really strong, the feeling of being able to climb anything."

Media 
Midtbø runs a successful eponymous YouTube channel, which has over one and a half million subscribers as of January 2023. On his channel, Midtbø posts videos centered around climbing; he often offers training advice, collaborates with fellow climbers, and has made several videos that highlight his athletic prowess. Most of his YouTube content is dedicated to his vlog series, which he began producing in March 2017. He also posts climbing and fitness-related content to his Instagram account, where he has more than 430,000 followers.

In 2013, Magnus Midtbø participated in a German TV show Der Deutsche Meister (the German Champion) as the international contestant in the Reckstangenklettern (salmon ladder) challenge. Midtbø beat the German contestant.

In January 2020, Magnus Midtbø represented Team Europe in American Ninja Warrior: USA vs. The World.

Trolltunga picture 
Midtbø received criticism in 2016 for publishing an Instagram picture of himself hanging off the Trolltunga rock formation, a popular tourist attraction in Norway. Wearing a safety harness, Midtbø suspended himself from the overhanging rock, but local police officers were concerned that the stunt might inspire others to replicate it without taking proper safety precautions.

Personal life
His sister, Hannah Midtbø (born 1990), is also a professional climber. She won the Nordic Championships (NM) in the lead climbing discipline in 2006 and has been a bouldering competitor at various IFSC World Cups and European Championships.

Rankings

World Games 
World Games record:

Number of medals in the IFSC Climbing World Cup 
IFSC Climbing World Cup

Lead

USA Climbing 
USA Climbing

IFSC Climbing World Youth Championships 
IFSC Climbing World Youth Championships

Number of medals in the Climbing European Youth Cup / Series

Lead 
European Youth Cup Winner: 2005, 2006, 2007

Scandinavia 
 Nordic champion 7 years in a row (2005–2011)
 Norwegian champion 11 years in a row (2005–2015)

References

External links
 IFSC Profile (2012 Archive) 
 8a.nu Profile
 YouTube Channel
 Instagram profile

1988 births
Living people
Norwegian rock climbers
Sportspeople from Bergen
World Games bronze medalists
Competitors at the 2013 World Games
Video bloggers
21st-century Norwegian people